David Blackwood Paul (1908–1965) was a New Zealand bookseller and publisher. He was born in Auckland, New Zealand, in 1908. His publishing firm was sold to Longman in 1967, and continued publishing as Longman Paul until 1972.

References

1908 births
1965 deaths
People from Auckland
New Zealand publishers (people)
New Zealand booksellers
Entrican family